The 1983 USA Outdoor Track and Field Championships took place between June 18–20 at IUPUI Track and Soccer Stadium on the campus of Indiana University-Purdue University Indianapolis in Indianapolis, Indiana. The meet was organized by The Athletics Congress.

The Marathon championships were the San Francisco Marathon for men and the Avon International Marathon for women.

In addition to being the National Championship, it was the selection meet to international teams including for the 1983 World Championships in Athletics.

This meet is famous for Carl Lewis' 200 meters, where after clearly separating from his competitors. he began celebrating more than 10 meters from the finish.  Presumed to have slowed because of the celebration, Lewis missed Pietro Mennea's altitude assisted world record by .03.  While he won the Olympic gold medal the following year, Lewis would never run faster.

Results

Men track events

Men field events

Women track events

Women field events

See also
United States Olympic Trials (track and field)

References

 Results from T&FN
 results

USA Outdoor Track and Field Championships
Usa Outdoor Track And Field Championships, 1983
Track and field
Track and field in Indiana
Outdoor Track and Field Championships
Outdoor Track and Field Championships
Sports in Indiana